Baba Hasan may refer to:
 Baba Hasan-e Jonubi
 Baba Hasan-e Shomali